"U Gurl" is a song by American country music singer Walker Hayes. It was released on October 15, 2021 as the second single from his third studio album Country Stuff the Album. Hayes co-wrote the song with Dylan Guthro and Jodi Guthro, and it was produced by Dylan Guthro.

Content
The inspiration of "U Gurl" is Laney Beville Hayes; Hayes’ wife of 17 years. Hayes stated in a press release: "With 'U Gurl' we wanted to capture that feeling when you look at your significant other, and you just can't take your eyes off them, yet in a fresh way, I get that feeling every day when I look at my wife". He posted a dance video with his children on Instagram for the track.

Charts

Weekly charts

Year-end charts

Certifications

References

2021 songs
2021 singles
Walker Hayes songs
Monument Records singles